Maryevka is a rural locality (a selo) and the administrative center of Maryevskoye Rural Settlement, Krasnogvardeysky District, Belgorod Oblast, Russia. The population was 526 as of 2010. There are 4 streets.

Geography 
Maryevka is located 20 km north of Biryuch (the district's administrative centre) by road. Repenka is the nearest rural locality.

References 

Rural localities in Krasnogvardeysky District, Belgorod Oblast